Ulfborg-Vemb was a municipality (Danish, kommune) in the former Ringkjøbing County on the west coast of the Jutland peninsula in west Denmark.

By January 1, 2007, Ulfborg-Vemb municipality ceased to exist due to Kommunalreformen ("The Municipality Reform" of 2007).  It was merged with existing Holstebro and Vinderup municipalities to form the new Holstebro municipality.  This created a municipality with an area of 790 km2 and a total population of 56,204.

Ulfborg-Vemb covered an area of 226 km2, and had a total population of 6,959 (2005).  Its mayor was Niels Kristian Jensen, a member of the Venstre (Liberal Party) political party.

The main town and the site of its municipal council was the town of Ulfborg.

Neighboring municipalities were Trehøje Municipality and Holstebro Municipality to the east, Struer Municipality and Lemvig Municipality to the north, and Ringkøbing Municipality to the south.  To the west is the North Sea.  Part of its northern border was defined by Nissum Fjord.

 Bur Parish
 Gørding Parish
 Husby Parish
 Madum Parish
 Staby Parish
 Sønder Nissum Parish
 Ulfborg Sogn Parish
 Vemb Parish

References 
 Municipal statistics: NetBorger Kommunefakta, delivered from KMD aka Kommunedata (Municipal Data)
 Municipal mergers and neighbors: Eniro new municipalities map

External links 
 Holstebro municipality's official website (Danish only)

Former municipalities of Denmark
Holstebro Municipality